Lara Sullivan (born 26 October 1969) is an Australian judoka. She competed in the women's half-middleweight event at the 1996 Summer Olympics.

References

External links
 

1969 births
Living people
Australian female judoka
Olympic judoka of Australia
Judoka at the 1996 Summer Olympics
People from Mount Isa